Mordellistena episternalis is a species of beetle in the family Mordellidae and is in the genus Mordellistena. It was described in 1856 by Étienne Mulsant and can be found in such European countries as Austria, Croatia, France, Germany, Greece, Hungary, Portugal, Slovakia, Spain, and the Netherlands.

References

episternalis
Beetles described in 1856
Beetles of Europe